The Patriot of Ukraine was an ultranationalist organization in Ukraine founded in 1999, disbanded in 2004, revived in 2005 and defunct since December 2014.  

In its original form, it was launched in 1999 and became paramilitary wing of the  Social-National Party of Ukraine (SNPU), and dissolved in 2004 when the latter rebranded in a less extremist form as Svoboda. Members of the Patriot of Ukraine refused to disband, and in 2005 Andriy Biletsky relaunched Pariot of Ukraine and it expanded into a political movement with national reach. 

In its 2005 incarnation, it was affiliated to the Social-National Assembly of Ukraine (S.N.A.), an assemblage of far right organizations and groups founded in 2008 that share the social-national ideology and agree upon building a social-national state in Ukraine. Both the Patriot of Ukraine and the S.N.A. engaged in political violence against minorities and their political opponents.

In an interview to the Left Bank on 10 December 2014, Biletsky announced that the Patriot of Ukraine as political organization suspended its activities due to the war situation in the country and dissolved primarily within the Azov Battalion. The group was one of the constituent elements of the party Svoboda. 

In 2016, former members of the Azov Battalions and the Patriot of Ukraine founded a new party named National Corps.

History

1999-2004
The origin of the Patriot of Ukraine can be traced to Lviv where the Association of Support for the Armed Forces and Navy of Ukraine Patriot Ukrayiny was registered on 10 June 1996 as a civic association, registration number 375.

The First Congress of the Patriot of Ukraine was held in Lviv on 12 December 1999 where it was officially adopted by the Social-National Party of Ukraine (SNPU) as its paramilitary youth wing. In the evening, around 1500 members of the SNPU and the Patriot of Ukraine staged a torchlight demonstration in the city. The first leader of the organization became Andriy Parubiy, who established a long-lasting tradition of torchlight parades, which became an organizational trademark. At that time Parubiy gained national notoriety in Ukraine after he was put on trial for alleged assault on communist demonstrators in Lviv on 7 November 1997. The main TV channels in Ukraine broadcast footage of Parubiy clashing with the demonstrators. The trial was dragged, moved around, and finally the case was dismissed due to the statute of limitations. A photo of Parubiy leading the Patriot of Ukraine march was placed on the cover of his book published in Lviv in 1999.

The Patriot of Ukraine was dissolved by the SNPU on 14 February 2004, when the Ninth Congress of the SNPU adopted the new name of VO Svoboda and elected Oleh Tyahnybok as its leader. Aiming at building a parliamentary type of political organization with an image of the "party of order", Svoboda had shaken off some old baggage, including Wolfsangel-type logo, which was replaced with the national colors and a trident (trizub) hand gesture (three raised fingers), the so-called "Trident of Liberty".

The original Patriot of Ukraine organization was also discarded since Svoboda wanted to appeal to a broader base of the Ukrainian electorate.  Eventually, while still remaining a radical nationalist party, Svoboda was able to benefit from its new strategy. First, it scored wins at the 2010 Ukrainian local elections in three regions of western Ukraine, then it won 10.5% of the national vote during the 2012 Ukrainian parliamentary election and created its own parliamentary faction in the Verkhovna Rada.

Re-establishment, 2005 

  

In 2005 the organisation was re-established. The Patriot of Ukraine defined itself as a "revolutionary vanguard of the Ukrainian social-nationalistic movement". The organization uses the Wolfsangel symbol, the difference is the color of the monogram as the SNPU used azure (blue) monogram on gold and the Patriot of Ukraine utilizes sable (black) on gold and gold on sable.

In 2007, the organization officially ended its relationship with Svoboda, a direct descendant to the Social-National Party of Ukraine.

In the party statement, it was announced as follows:

Despite the split some prominent Svoboda's members such as Andriy Illienko, Chairman of the Kiev City Branch of the Vo Svoboda (Freedom) All-Ukrainian Union and a member of the Verhovna Rada, continued to advocate social-nationalism and idea of the two revolutions (national and social) which created a common ground with the Patriot of Ukraine.

Some researchers pointed to the fact that even after the declarative break-up, VO Svoboda continued to benefit:

in 2008, Kharkiv Human Rights Protection Group issued a public letter, denouncing Patriot of Ukraine's activity in Kharkiv. In it, it compared actions that Patriot of Ukraine had conducted against foreign students to similar behavior in Russia neo-nazi groups. The group noted openly racist and xenophobic writings by Patriot of Ukraine ideologue Oleh Odnorozhenko on the group's website.

Vasylkiv terrorists case, 2011 
In August 2011, three Patriot of Ukraine supporters were arrested and convicted in the so-called Vasylkiv terrorists case, in which three members in Kharkiv attempted to blow up a statue of Vladimir Lenin. At the same time, there was an armed assault on the headquarters of Patriot of Ukraine in Kharkiv during which two members were wounded, while the assailant was injured. Patriot of Ukraine members were arrested and charged with an attempted murder on 11 September 2011. On 19 November 2011, there was an attempt on Biletsky's life when he was fired upon in Kharkiv receiving two bullet wounds. Biletsky managed to bring himself to the city hospital where he was operated upon. The local law enforcement classified the event as hooliganism. On 27 December 2011, Biletsky was also arrested on the same charges along with other Patriot of Ukraine members and was held in detention at the Kharkiv investigation jail (remand) for 28 months.

2013-14 Euromaidan to dissolution

At the end of 2013, at the beginning of the Euromaidan protest movement, the Patriot of Ukraine created the Right Sector along with other far-right and nationalist parties and groups, including the Trident of Stepan Bandera (Dmytro Yarosh), UNA-UNSO (Oleksandr Muzychko) and the White Hammer (Vladislav Goranin), although they would later be dissociated.

During the Euromaidan, militants from the Patriot of Ukraine were active participants of major clashes with the riot police. According to Igor Krivoruchko, a leader of the Kiev's S.N.A. branch, they seized and burned the headquarters in Kiev of the Party of Regions (the ruling party) on 18 February 2014.

On 29 April 2014, the Patriot of Ukraine together with the Spilna Sprava staged a torch rally procession in Kiev to commemorate the Euromaidan fallen heroes. The self-defense of Euromaidan attempted to disperse the rally and as a result a massive fist fight near Maidan Nezalezhnosti flared up.

On 10 December 2014, Biletsky announced that the Patriot of Ukraine as political organization suspended its activities due to the war situation in the country and dissolved primarily within the Azov Battalion.

Ideology and program 
The Patriot of Ukraine promoted an extreme nationalist, racist and Islamophobic platform and sometimes used neo-Nazi symbols, including:
 Political violence
 Racism
 Neo-Nazism
 Racialism
 Direct action
 National solidarity 
 National hierarchy
 Obedience and personal devotion to the national leader 
 Greater Ukraine, i.e. the creation of the Third Ukrainian Empire (after Scythia and Kievan Rus') from the Baltic to the Caucuses

See also 
 Ukrainian nationalism

External links 
 patriotukr.org.ua (Authorization required)
 patriotukr.org.ua. Archived on Oct 17, 2014.
 rid.org.ua. Archived on Dec 18, 2014.
 МВ Рід, rid.org.ua. Archived on Oct 7, 2014.
 Студія МоNоліт The Patriot of Ukraine YouTube channel
 Patriot of Ukraine recruitment video YouTube
 S.N.A. Facebook account
 S.N.A. Twitter account

References 

Euromaidan
Neo-Nazism in Ukraine
Organizations based in Kharkiv
Organizations based in Lviv